I Am Weasel is an American animated television series created by David Feiss for Cartoon Network and produced at Hanna-Barbera. It is the fourth of the network's Cartoon Cartoons. The series centers on I.M. Weasel (voiced by Michael Dorn), a smart, noble, and successful weasel, I.R. Baboon (voiced by Charlie Adler), an unintelligent and rude baboon who is envious of Weasel and acts as both his rival and friend, and the mischievous Red Guy (also voiced by Adler), who often antagonizes the two.

I Am Weasel originally aired as a segment of Cow and Chicken from 1997 to 1999, often airing as the third of three segments in an episode, and was eventually spun off into its own series. A fifth season with 27 new episodes aired from June 10, 1999, to 2000 and joined the original 52 which were previously part of Cow and Chicken. The entire series includes 79 episodes overall.

Premise 
The series chronicles the random adventures of two animal frenemies: I.M. Weasel (Michael Dorn) and I.R. Baboon (Charlie Adler). The first one is a famous, heroic, eloquent, highly intelligent and very talented least weasel who always tries to help people out and is thus adored by everybody, constantly shouting his catchphrase "I am Weasel!" while pointing high in the air before going after help. The latter is his foil, an ugly and idiotic hamadryas baboon who is envious of Weasel's success and constantly tries to do better than he does (also doing a victory dance to express his joy when thinking he is doing so), and failing miserably after all due to his total stupidity.

Starting from season two, the Red Guy (Charlie Adler), a main character in Cow and Chicken, also gets that role in I Am Weasel, where he is also referred to as "I.B. Red Guy", an allusion to Weasel's and Baboon's names. His addition to the series makes him gradually take the role of villain from I.R., who becomes more friendly to Weasel, despite still despising him.

As the series progresses, I.M. Weasel, initially showed as an invincible hero, gradually loses the focus to I.R. Baboon, because people are shown to get gradually dumber, sometimes being manipulated by the Red Guy into doing that. In the series finale, I.R. is finally presented as the true star of the show instead of him.

Supporting characters include Loulabelle (Susanne Blakeslee, Teresa Ganzel), Jolly Roger (Dee Bradley Baker) and Admiral Bullets (Jess Harnell, Michael Gough). Many characters from Cow and Chicken make cameo appearances in I Am Weasel from season two, these include: Cow, Chicken (Charlie Adler), Mom, Teacher (Candi Milo), Dad (Dee Bradley Baker), Flem (Howard Morris), and Earl (Dan Castellaneta).

Universe setting 
While season one does not have any link to Cow and Chicken universe, from season two, I Am Weasel usually happens in the same universe of that show, as its characters (mainly the Red Guy) usually appear, but, most of the time, in different places. David Feiss, in fact, cross-populated both series as it made the work easier and he felt it was always the same universe. An episode, though, does present I Am Weasel as a TV show airing in Cow and Chicken world, suggesting another universe, but Weasel and I.R. are both taken out of TV after all. The same occurs in another episode, but with the characters in the same universe.

Characters 

 I.M. Weasel (Michael Dorn): A highly intelligent, skilled and famous weasel who mostly plays a straight man role in a world full of idiots. While very helpful and beloved at the beginning of the series, he eventually starts to show frustration with people's antics and his "hero" status towards them becomes more fallible.
 I.R. Baboon (Charlie Adler): A dimwitted and jealous baboon, he eventually becomes Weasel's best friend. Shown in the beginning as trying to persuade people's attention from Weasel, always failing miserably and being hated, he eventually gets a "hero" status as the world becomes just as stupid as him. He is known for his habit of going into a rage if people laugh at his buttocks. Always wears a white t-shirt with an upside-down "I.R." written by himself on it. He's said to be 40 years old in the episode "I.R.'s First Bike".
 The Red Guy (Charlie Adler): Also cited as "I.B. Red Guy", he's a comical devil character who presents himself with a different personality each episode he appears, similar to Cow and Chicken, trying to persuade and scam the central characters. He may sometimes play as a third main character.
 Jolly Roger (Dee Bradley Baker): A fat and tall man who always wears a tuxedo along a sailor costume, named after the pirate flag.
 Loulabelle (Susanne Blakeslee / Teresa Ganzel): An assistant woman to Weasel, a blonde nurse. Also shown as laboratory assistant in one episode. Implied as Weasel's girlfriend in seasons two and three.
 Admiral Bullets (Jess Harnell / Michael Gough): A short-sized admiral always seen standing up over a small bench. He appears only in the early seasons calling up for Weasel's help.
 Cow and Chicken characters: Usually appear on cameos or crossovers, either as part of the show or of their own universe, more often in later seasons. These include Cow and Chicken, their parents and teacher and Flem and Earl.

Development and production

Creation and concept 

Cow and Chicken started out as the pilot episode "No Smoking" on What a Cartoon! in 1995, and was greenlit to become a series. Cartoon Network demanded a second cartoon to join Cow and Chicken in its half-hour time slot, so David Feiss came up with I Am Weasel, loosely based upon the novel I Am Legend, one of his favorite books as a teenager. "I was doodling one day, and drew a weasel, with the title 'I Am Weasel', off of one of my favorite books as a teenager, Richard Matheson's I Am Legend. I thought against type, that instead of a weasel who was a weasel, this guy would be smart and heroic".

According to Feiss, the idea for creating the show began as a single drawing of I.M. Weasel with the caption "I Am Weasel" and that suggested many stories to him. The concept for the rivalry between a weasel and a baboon came up from the classic nursery rhyme "Pop Goes the Weasel", where a monkey is said to be chasing a weasel. Also, the fact that the Red Guy does not wear pants was controversial for many people, as he said: "The thing that I never thought that I'd get approval for was the Red Guy. The mere fact that he didn't wear pants was a challenge for a lot of people and I am glad Cartoon Network let it go - he's my favorite character".

Production began around April 1996 and the show was inserted as a series of segments in Cow and Chicken until mid 1999. Right after the end of that show, it was spun-off into a new separated series produced until September 16, 1999, with all the previous episodes incorporated and removed from Cow and Chicken.

General production took place at the studio of Hanna-Barbera, in Los Angeles, with the series being labeled as part of both the collection of cartoons of that company and Cartoon Network's Cartoon Cartoons. Animation production was made overseas by Rough Draft Korea, in Seoul.

Retooling 

From season two onward, the show's story, recurring characters and art style underwent significant changes. I.R. Baboon went on to become gradually more friendly to Weasel and less seen as antagonist, as that role was taken over by the Red Guy. Supporting characters from seasons one to three, such as Loulabelle and Admiral Bullets, became less and less seen, completely being absent in seasons four and five. Many characters from Cow and Chicken were added as supporting or recurring characters. That was explained by Feiss: "There was a lot of pressure to complete Cow and Chicken quickly, and I felt that I couldn't dedicate enough time to the second show. But Cartoon Network wanted to spin off Weasel, so we did. I don't really remember asking if I could or could not cross populate the two shows--I just did it because it felt like the same universe, plus I thought it was funny to have the Red Guy in I Am Weasel".

The story started to show more of Weasel's shortcomings and at times allowed him to lapse into a wise fool, suffering similar gags as I.R., as opposed of the invincible folk hero role he played on season one. I.R. Baboon started to become more like a hero than a villain, also taking that role from Weasel in some episodes of season five, leading to the finale. The show never truly dropped its premise of Weasel serving to contrast Baboon's stupidity and failures (the very thing that allowed Baboon to usurp him in the final episode as the key piece of the entertainment) and that Weasel retained more than enough intelligence and morality to serve as his defining characteristics, among the cast.

The exact same art style of Cow and Chicken is used starting from season two. Season one is a bit different, including the title cards for episodes, which feature animation and Weasel saying the name of the episode with additional commentary and/or events, contrasting with the style also used for Cow and Chicken, with static image.

Humor style 
Humor relies on slapstick comedy and moderate off-color humor, as typical of many 1990s cartoons, and is based on the existent gap between the central characters, with I.R. Baboon being the center of most running jokes, which are mostly about his stupidity and big red butt, though some episodes show I.M. Weasel or the Red Guy also taking this role. Butt jokes are also more frequent when the Red Guy is around and parodies of popular culture and other shows and crossovers also take place in some episodes. Despite all the comedic style, important and meaningful messages about friendship, social differences and general lessons for life are given to children through stories or when I.M. Weasel directly talks to the audience.

Season one shows Weasel as a "perfect" character, not leaving a single shortcoming, and Baboon as exact opposite to this, but that gradually changes throughout the series, with Weasel later starting to show some misbehavior and inefficiency, mostly because he notices people around him are getting dumber, and thus I.R. even being dimwitted gets a hero status. From season two onward, the Red Guy incorporates the style of humor found in Cow and Chicken, taking the role of villain, but also appearing as a third wheel. In season five, Jolly Roger also starts to fill both roles.

Episodes usually reference the show name and I.M. Weasel with titles in first person, and a great number of them also make fun of I.R. Baboon's misspelling, with grammatically incorrect names such as "I  Big Star", "I  Good Salesmans" and "I   Artiste".

The fourth wall is often broken, mostly at the end of episodes. The characters do it to make some ending commentaries, give advice to spectators or just call for the end of the episode.

Title, credits and music 
The title sequence features I.M. Weasel constantly saying his catchphrase "I am Weasel!" and I.R. Baboon doing his trademarked victory dance. The series ending credits were only created in 1999, with the separation; it credits all involved in the three years of production and the theme song is played instrumentally in a pop rock style, with additional arrangement.

The theme song was composed by Bill Fulton, written by Richard Pursel, and sung by April March. It is a humorous take on the well-known version of "Pop Goes the Weasel".

Voice cast 

Michael Dorn provided voice for I.M. Weasel and Charlie Adler did both voices of I.R. Baboon and the Red Guy. Loulabelle was voiced by Susanne Blakeslee in season two and Teresa Ganzel in season three, Jolly Roger by Dee Bradley Baker, and Admiral Bullets by Jess Harnell in season one and Michael Gough in season two. Feiss originally considered James Earl Jones for the role of I.M. Weasel since he was the announcer of Cartoon Network's sister channel CNN, but Dorn was recommended to him by his friend and Johnny Bravo creator Van Partible.

Additional characters were voiced by the aforementioned along with Carlos Alazraqui, Dan Castellaneta, Dom DeLuise, Tom Kenny, Candi Milo, Howard Morris and Frank Welker, among others.

Guest stars include Phyllis Diller, Mark Hamill, Ed McMahon, Laraine Newman, Jeremy Piven, George Segal, Susan Tyrell and Mary Woronov.

Broadcast

Broadcast history 
A sneak peek for the series was aired on July 15, 1997 with the eleventh episode, "Law of Gravity", and then it started its original run from July 22, 1997 with the second episode, "I.R. on Sun", all yet as a series of segments on Cow and Chicken. After four seasons, it was separated and premiered as a half-hour show on June 10, 1999, and the 52 episodes originally aired on Cow and Chicken began to air on the show's own time slot, being either in or outside the Cartoon Cartoon Fridays programming block, and getting joined by 27 new episodes, totaling 79. The original run ended in early 2000.

Reruns aired prominently from early 2000 to 2002, including on Cartoon Cartoon Fridays. From September 2005 to June 2006, it returned sporadically as segments on The Cartoon Cartoon Show, along with other Cartoon Cartoons from that era. On April 13, 2012, the series returned on Cartoon Planet before being removed in 2013. It was also aired on Boomerang, but only with seasons 1 to 4 along the Cow and Chicken segments, and on Cartoon Network Too in the United Kingdom. Some episodes were also made available on Cartoon Network Video in the early 2010s. From June 25, 2017, season one was made available on Netflix in Australia, along Cow and Chicken. It started to be available worldwide on HBO Max from 2022 onward.

The show is rated TV-Y7 in the United States, and G (General) in both Australia and New Zealand.

Brazilian miniseries 
In Brazil, an animated miniseries named Terra à Vista ("Land in Sight") was produced in 2000 for Cartoon Network, and tells the story of the Portuguese arriving at Brazil with a humorous take, using characters from Cartoon Cartoons, including I.M. Weasel, I.R. Baboon and the Red Guy. It was broadcast on Cartoon Network Brazil from March 6 to April 22, 2000 and has 8 episodes. This series was also the first-ever Cartoon Network production exclusively made for Brazil.

Episodes 

The series consists of five seasons and 79 episodes. The first four seasons contain the segments that originally aired during broadcasts of Cow and Chicken, while the fifth contains a further 27 episodes produced independently of that show. They were all eventually mend up into the whole I Am Weasel series, although they still air sometimes within Cow and Chicken timeslots.

There was a small case of censorship in the episode "I.R. Mommy", in which the letter "N", present on an American football helmet used by I.R. Baboon (a reference to the Nebraska Cornhuskers), had to be digitally removed in 1999 after Cartoon Network was sued by the University of Nebraska, who alleged the reference was derogatory for their institution. No other episode suffered censorship so far.

Ratings 
It became one of the most successful Cartoon Network original series of its time, usually being remembered along other major Cartoon Cartoons and recording high ratings for the network in both incarnations of season one and seasons two to five.

The premiere of season five on June 10, 1999 reached 1.8 million viewers in households, acquiring 4.4 with kids 2-11 and 4.6 with kids 6-11. It was also the fifth most watched show on Cartoon Network in 2000, with an average rating of 1.8 million viewers, only and not far behind The Powerpuff Girls (1.9), Tom and Jerry (2.0), Courage the Cowardly Dog (2.1) and Dexter's Laboratory (2.3).

Back in 1997 and 1998, I Am Weasel along Cow and Chicken, Johnny Bravo and Dexter's Laboratory, were responsible for increasing Cartoon Network's average ratings.

Merchandise

Home media 
Both VHS and DVD releases have been produced for the series. Although no official media containing complete seasons has been released in the United States as of 2022, a Cartoon Cartoons VHS from 1998 dedicated to the show contains the episodes "My Friend, the Smart Banana", "I.R. Pixie Fairie" and "I.R. in Wrong Cartoon", and a Cartoon Cartoon Fridays VHS in 1999 includes episodes alongside other series. Cartoon Network has released special Halloween and Christmas holiday DVDs in 2004 and 2005, distributed by Warner Home Video, containing one or two episodes. In the United Kingdom, a compilation DVD of Cartoon Network shows containing one episode of the series was released.

In Thailand, volumes have been released on DVD since 2009 by MVD Company; a single-disc volume titled Season One with a runtime of 99 minutes was released on December 23, 2009. In Australia and New Zealand, a two-disc Collection 1 DVD was launched in 2011, distributed by Madman Entertainment. This release includes all episodes from the episode's single standalone season.

Audio 
The show also has two audio tracks featured in Cartoon Medley, a compilation album made by Kid Rhino for Cartoon Network, containing tracks from many animated series from the network and others. It was released on July 6, 1999, in CD and cassette releases, and contains the show's audio tracks "I Am Weasel", which is the theme song, and "I.M. Weasel's Poem", an oral text spoken by I.M. Weasel.

Comics 
From 1999 to 2005, I Am Weasel had stories featured on three collective comic series published by DC Comics: Cartoon Network Starring (1999–2000), Cartoon Cartoons (2001–2004; having lead stories on issues #5 and #19) and Cartoon Network Block Party! (2004–2009). It was presented along stories from many Cartoon Network original series, such as Dexter's Laboratory, Johnny Bravo, Cow and Chicken, Ed, Edd n Eddy, Courage the Cowardly Dog, The Grim Adventures of Billy and Mandy, Sheep in the Big City, among others. The characters also appeared in the crossover comic series The Powerpuff Girls: Super Smash-Up!.

Gaming 
An I Am Weasel-themed checkers set was part of a promotion made by Cartoon Network in the late 1990s/early 2000s.

On the kart racing video game, Cartoon Network Racing, available for PlayStation 2 and Nintendo DS, I.M. Weasel is a playable character, while I.R. Baboon and the Red Guy must be unlocked to play with, but the first is available in the DS version only.  Also, only in the PS2 version, the episodes "Enemy Camp" and "My Friend, the Smart Banana" are available as extras which can be unlocked by winning the "UR Challenged Cup" and "I.M. Weasel Super Tournament" modes, respectively.

In the MMO game, Cartoon Network Universe: FusionFall, there was an item named "I.R. Baboon shorts", which were player-wearable shorts based upon I.R. Baboon's buttocks.

Flash games of the series were also available on Cartoon Network website during the 1990s and 2000s.

In other languages 

 Chinese: 黄鼠狼威索
 Danish: Jeg Er Væsel
 Finnish: Olen Näätä
 French: Monsieur Belette
 German: Ich Bin Wiesel
 Hungarian: Én Vagyok Menyus

 Italian: Io sono Donato Fidato
 Polish: Jam Łasica
 Portuguese: Eu Sou o Máximo (Brazil) / Eu Sou o Weasel (Portugal)
 Russian: Я — горностай
 Spanish: Soy La Comadreja (Latin America) / Soy Comadreja (Spain)
 Thai: ข้าคือวีเซิล

See also 
 Cow and Chicken
 Cartoon Cartoons
 List of fictional animals
 List of works produced by Hanna-Barbera Productions

Notes

References

External links 

 I Am Weasel at the Cartoon Network's Department of Cartoons (web archive)
 Official production website (web archive)
 
 

Cartoon Cartoons
1990s American animated television series
2000s American animated television series
1990s American children's comedy television series
2000s American children's comedy television series
1997 American television series debuts
2000 American television series endings
American children's animated adventure television series
American children's animated comedy television series
Television series by Hanna-Barbera
Television series created by David Feiss
Cartoon Network original programming
English-language television shows
American animated television spin-offs
Animated television series about mammals
Animated television series about monkeys
Fiction about the Devil
Television shows adapted into comics
Television shows adapted into video games
Fictional weasels
Crossover animated television series